Simon Kane (born 9 October 1967 in Sydney, New South Wales) is an Australian former race car driver, but now works as a sound technician in television.

Career
Kane started in Formula Fords in the late 1980s and proceeded to the new Formula Holden series in 1989. In 1990 he won the Australian Drivers' Championship and consequently CAMS Gold Star. From there he had a disappointing International Formula 3000 season in 1991 for Italian team Motor Racing Di-Wheels, failing to qualify for the two events he entered at Hockenheim in Germany and Brands Hatch in England (rounds 6 & 7).

He then returned to Australia and spasmodically entered Australian Drivers' Championship rounds in coming years and achieved a top five result at the one-off 1993 Indonesian Grand Prix. He now races some club events in a Porsche 911.

Career results

Complete International Formula 3000 results
(key) (Races in bold indicate pole position) (Races 
in italics indicate fastest lap)

References
 
 1988 Australian Formula Ford "Driver to Europe" Results

1967 births
Formula Holden drivers
International Formula 3000 drivers
Living people
Racing drivers from Sydney